Bullock Creek is a stream in York County, South Carolina, in the United States.

Bullock Creek was named for the bison bulls once seen there.

See also
List of rivers of South Carolina

References

Rivers of York County, South Carolina
Rivers of South Carolina